"Bringing It Back" is a song by British rappers Digga D and AJ Tracey. It was released as a digital download on 4 February 2021. The single peaked at number 5 on the UK Singles Chart, and topped the UK's Official Trending Chart. The song was released as the third single from Digga D's second commercial mixtape, Made in the Pyrex (2021) and AJ Tracey's second studio album Flu Game (2021).

Background
On 16 October 2020, Digga D and AJ Tracey teased the collaboration on social media by posting pictures of the two of them in the studio. The song was produced by The Elements and AOD, and written by Digga D and AJ Tracey.

Music video
The official music video was directed by KC Locke and Digga D, released on 4 February 2021. The video referenced early stages of their careers by re-creating scenes from 1011's "Next Up" freestyle on Mixtape Madness and AJ Tracey's "Packages" Mic Check freestyle on Link Up TV.

Personnel
Credits adapted from Tidal.
 Rhys Herbert – writer
 AJ Tracey – writer
 The Elements – producer
 AOD – producer

Charts

Certifications

Release history

References

2021 singles
2021 songs
AJ Tracey songs
Digga D songs
Songs written by AJ Tracey
Songs written by Digga D
UK drill songs